The 2017–18 Xavier Musketeers women's basketball team represents Xavier University during the 2017–18 NCAA Division I women's basketball season. The Musketeers, led by seventh-year head coach Brian Neal, play their games at the Cintas Center and were members of the Big East Conference. They finished the season 10–20, 3–15 in Big East play to finish in a tie for last place. They lost in the first round of the Big East women's tournament to Seton Hall.

Previous season
They finished the season 12–18, 4–14 in Big East play to finish in a tie for seventh place. They lost in the first round of the Big East women's tournament to Butler.

Roster

Schedule

|-
!colspan=9 style=| Non-conference regular season

|-
!colspan=9 style=| Big East regular season

|-
!colspan=9 style=| Big East Women's Tournament

See also
2017–18 Xavier Musketeers men's basketball team

References

Xavier
Xavier Musketeers women's basketball seasons